Almeng is a South Korean singing duo known for appearing on the reality television competition show K-pop Star Season 3. The duo consists of Choi Rin and Lee Hae-Young. They released their debut extended play, compoSing of Love, on October 21, 2014.

Discography

Extended plays

Singles

References

External links
 

K-pop music groups
South Korean musical duos
South Korean pop music groups
South Korean idol groups
South Korean dance music groups
South Korean contemporary R&B musical groups
South Korean hip hop groups
K-pop Star participants